Softly, as I Leave You is a 1964 studio album by American singer Frank Sinatra. This album was Sinatra's first tentative attempt to come to terms with rock and roll music. Arranged by Ernie Freeman, "Softly, as I Leave You", "Then Suddenly Love" and "Available" are definitely stabs at incorporating rock and roll into Sinatra's middle-of-the-road pop sound, featuring drum kits, backing vocals and keyboards.

The rest of the album is pieced together with leftovers from various early-'60s sessions, from many different arrangers and conductors, giving the album a rather uneven feel.

The title track was the first of at least four attempts to mimic the chart success of Dean Martin's #1 hit "Everybody Loves Somebody", using a driving beat, heavy strings and choral tracks. Sinatra, arranger Ernie Freeman and producer Jimmy Bowen would incorporate the same sound to songs like "When Somebody Loves You", "Tell Her You Love Her (Each Day)" and "Somewhere in Your Heart" with only minor chart success.

Track listing
"Emily" (Johnny Mandel, Johnny Mercer) – 2:58
"Here's to the Losers" (Robert Wells, Jack Segal) – 3:05
"Dear Heart" (Jay Livingston, Ray Evans, Henry Mancini) – 2:43
"Come Blow Your Horn" (Sammy Cahn, Jimmy Van Heusen) – 3:07
"Love Isn't Just for the Young" (Bernard Knee, Herb Miller) – 2:57
"I Can't Believe I'm Losing You" (Don Costa, Phil Zeller) – 2:43
"Pass Me By" (Cy Coleman, Carolyn Leigh) – 2:25
"Softly, as I Leave You" (Hal Shaper, Antonio DeVita, Giorgio Calabrese) – 2:50
"Then Suddenly Love" (Roy Alfred, Paul Vance) – 2:15
"Available" (Cahn, Ned Wynn, L.B. Marks) – 2:47
"Talk to Me Baby" (Robert Emmett Dolan, Mercer) – 3:00
"The Look of Love" (Cahn, Van Heusen) – 2:43

Notes 
Tracks 1, 3 and 7 recorded on October 3, 1964
Uncredited Background Singers perform on Tracks 1, 3 and 7-10
The Orchestra on Tracks 1, 3 and 6-7 includes 9 Violins
Tracks 2 and 5 recorded on July 31, 1963
The Orchestra on Tracks 2, 5 and 8-10 includes 12 Violins
"Come Blow Your Horn" recorded on January 21, 1963
Jimmy Van Heusen is also known as James Van Heusen
The Orchestra on Tracks 4 and 12 includes 10 Violins
"I Can't Believe I'm Losing You" recorded on April 8, 1964
Tracks 8-10 recorded on July 17, 1964
"Talk to Me Baby" recorded on December 3, 1963
The Orchestra on "Talk to Me Baby" includes 14 Violins
Robert Emmett Dolan is also known as Robert Dolan
"The Look of Love" recorded on August 27, 1962

Personnel

Main
Frank Sinatra - vocals (2, 4-6, 11-12, lead on 1, 3, 7-10)
Don Costa - arranger (6, 11), conductor (11)
Ernie Freeman - arranger, conductor (8-10)
Neal Hefti - conductor (12)
Billy May - arranger (7)
Marty Paich - arranger, conductor (2, 5)
Nelson Riddle - arranger (1, 3-4, 6, 12), conductor (1, 3-4, 6-7)

Strings
LeRoy Collins - viola (2, 5)
Joe Comfort - string bass (4)
Joseph DiFiore - viola (8-10)
Joseph DiTullio - cello (12)
Justin DiTullio - cello (2, 5, 8-10, 12)
Alvin Dinkin - viola (1, 3, 7-11)
Cecil Figelsky - viola (2, 5)
Eddie Gilbert - string bass (11)
Anne Goodman - cello (1, 3, 6-10)
Stanley Harris - viola (2, 4-5, 11-12)
Allan Harshman - viola (2, 4-5, 12)
Armand Kaproff - cello (1-3, 5-7)
Louis Kievman - viola (2, 5)
Ray Kramer - cello (2, 4-5, 11)
Edgar Lustgarten - cello (1, 3, 7, 11-12)
Virginia Majewski - viola (1-3, 5, 7, 11)
Joe Mondragon - string bass (2, 5, 8–10)
Alex Neiman - viola (6, 8-10, 12)
Gareth Nuttycombe - viola (8-10)
Ralph Peña - string bass (1, 3, 6-7, 12)
David Pratt - cello (6)
Kurt Reher - cello (4, 8-11)
Paul Robyn - viola (4, 6, 11)
Nino Rosso - cello (11-12)
Emmett Sargeant - cello (8-10)
Eleanor Slatkin - cello (2, 4-5)

Horns and Woodwinds
Harry Betts - trombone (12)
Hoyt Bohannon - trombone (11)
Robert Bryant - trumpet (8-10)
Conte Candoli - trumpet (2, 5)
Pete Candoli - trumpet (6)
John Cave - French horn (1, 3-4, 7, 11)
Gene Cipriano - saxophone (1, 3-4, 7), flute (4), woodwinds (1, 3, 7)
Buddy Collette - woodwinds (8–10)
Bob Cooper - saxophone, clarinet, bass clarinet (2, 5)
Vincent DeRosa - French horn (1, 3-4, 7, 11)
Henry Edison - trumpet (6)
Don Fagerquist - trumpet (4, 12)
Chuck Gentry - saxophone (1, 3, 7, 11), bass clarinet (11), woodwinds (1, 3, 7)
Arthur Gleghorn - saxophone, flute (11)
Conrad Gozzo - trumpet (12)
Herman Gunkler - saxophone, flute (12)
William Hinshaw - French horn (6)
Paul Horn - saxophone, flute, clarinet (2, 5)
Joe Howard - trombone (2, 5)
Jules Jacob - oboe (11), saxophone (11-12), clarinet, bass clarinet (12)
Plas Johnson - saxophone (1, 3-4, 7, 12), flute (12), clarinet (4), woodwinds (1, 3, 6-7)
Harry Klee - saxophone (1-5, 7, 11), flute (2, 4-5, 11), clarinet (4), woodwinds (1, 3, 6-7)
Joe Koch - saxophone, bass clarinet (4, 12), woodwinds (6)
Ronny Lang - saxophone, flute (12)
Richard Leith - trombone (2, 5)
Cappy Lewis - trumpet (1, 3-4, 6-7)
Sinclair Lott - French horn (12)
Arthur Maebe - French horn (12)
Gail Martin - trombone (6)
Dick Nash - trombone (2, 4-6, 11-12)
Ted Nash - saxophone, flute (2, 5)
Jack Nimitz - clarinet (2, 5), saxophone, bass clarinet (2, 5, 11)
Dick Noel - trombone (4, 11-12)
Tommy Pederson - trombone (6)
Richard Perissi - French horn (1-3, 5, 7, 12)
Al Porcino - trumpet (2, 5, 12)
George Roberts - bass trombone (4, 11)
Willie Schwartz - saxophone (1, 3-4, 7, 11), clarinet (4, 11), flute (4), woodwinds (1, 3, 6-7)
George Seaberg - trumpet (4)
Tom Shepard - trombone (4, 6)
Shorty Sherock - trumpet (4, 6)
Gene Sherry - French horn (2, 5-6)
Ken Shroyer - bass trombone (1, 3, 7, 12)
George Smith - saxophone, clarinet (11)
Ray Triscari - trumpet (2, 5)
Champ Webb - woodwinds (6)
Stu Williamson - trumpet (2, 5, 12)

Other Instrumentalists
Dale Anderson - congas, timpani (2, 5)
Hal Blaine - drums (8-10)
Irv Cottler - drums (1-3, 5-7, 11-12), chimes (12)
Aida Dagort - harp (4)
Frank Flynn - timpani, bells (12)
Carl Fortina - accordion (11)
Gene Garf - piano (8-10)
Bobby Gibbons - guitar (1, 3, 7-11)
Al Hendrickson - guitar (2, 5, 8-10)
Kathryn Julye - harp (2, 5-6, 11)
Mel Lewis - drums (4)
Bill Miller - piano (All Tracks)
Verlye Mills - harp (12)
Emil Richards - percussion (1, 3, 6-11), timpani (4)
Ray Sherman - piano (1, 3, 7-10)
Ann Mason Stockton - harp (1, 3, 7)
Tommy Tedesco - guitar (1, 3, 7-10)
Vincent Terri - guitar (1, 3, 7)
Al Viola - guitar (1, 3-4, 6-7, 11-12)

References

1964 albums
Frank Sinatra albums
Albums arranged by Marty Paich
Albums arranged by Nelson Riddle
Albums arranged by Billy May
Reprise Records albums
Albums arranged by Ernie Freeman
Albums conducted by Nelson Riddle
Albums conducted by Neal Hefti
Albums produced by Jimmy Bowen
Albums produced by Sonny Burke